Athous iristonicus is a species of click beetle from the family Elateridae found in central Caucasian states such as Chechnya, Ingushetia, Kabardino-Balkaria, and North Ossetia–Alania.

References

Beetles of Asia
Insects of Russia
Beetles described in 1971
Dendrometrinae